Avis Willington (born 12 August 1956) is a British former swimmer. Willington competed in two events at the 1972 Summer Olympics.

She also represented England and won a bronze medal in the 4 x 100 metres freestyle relay event, at the 1974 British Commonwealth Games in Christchurch, New Zealand.

References

External links
 

1956 births
Living people
British female swimmers
Olympic swimmers of Great Britain
Swimmers at the 1972 Summer Olympics
Place of birth missing (living people)
Commonwealth Games medallists in swimming
Commonwealth Games bronze medallists for England
Swimmers at the 1974 British Commonwealth Games
20th-century British women
Medallists at the 1974 British Commonwealth Games